The Weavers' Triangle is an area of Burnley in Lancashire, England consisting mostly of 19th-century industrial buildings at the western side of town centre clustered around the Leeds and Liverpool Canal. The area has significant historic interest as the cotton mills and associated buildings encapsulate the social and economic development of the town and its weaving industry. From the 1980s, the area has been the focus of major redevelopment efforts.

History

In the 1700s, Burnley, like Marsden and Colne, was a centre of the wool industry. It switched to cotton in the first half of the 1800s. Hargreaves' hand-operated spinning jenny was introduced in Blackburn in 1767; the model patented had 16 sixteen spindles and was treated with suspicion. The spinning jenny produced thread suitable for weft. Arkwright's power-driven water frame, which produced the greater twist suitable for warp, was even more unpopular. In 1777, Arkwright built a mill at Birkacre in Chorley. By 1779, the momentum against power-driven spinning machinery was such that rioters destroyed it. Spinners and investors were driven from Blackburn and Burnley towards Manchester, and it was many years before a spinning mill was built in Burnley.

In the early 1790s, construction of the Leeds and Liverpool Canal resumed after a decade-long suspension caused by the American War of Independence. During this time, the increasing economic importance of coal led to a change in the agreed. but disputed, route of the canal. It was moved south, away from Clitheroe's agricultural lime, to a more expensive route via the Burnley Coalfield. At Burnley, the route almost encircled the town, passing through fields outside of it. Although weaving existed in the area, it was a woollen industry for local markets. The canal's opening coincided with the rise of cotton weaving and the use of steam power in textile mills, allowing greater freedom in their placement.

The 1840s proved pivotal to the development of the area. The canal company began allowing mills to take the water they needed for steam engines directly from the canal. In 1848, the East Lancashire Railway opened to the barracks near the western end of Trafalgar Street. And in 1849, the Manchester and Leeds Railway opened a branch from Todmorden to Burnley (extended soon after). A goods shed was sited at Thorneybank at the eastern end of Trafalgar Street, where the town's cinema stands today. Of the many new cotton mills subsequently constructed along the canal, this meant that the greatest concentration formed in what was then part of the township of Habergham Eaves.

The second half of the 19th century saw Burnley develop into the most important cotton-weaving town in the world. The area later to be known as the weavers' triangle, officially became part of the town in 1894. By 1911, the town's textile industry was at the height of its prosperity, and there were approximately 99,000 power looms in operation. The town's population had grown from 4,000 (1801) to over 100,000.

The almost terminal decline of the English cotton industry in the decades that followed World War II, brought great difficulties to the local economy. During successive attempts to regenerate the town, many of the mills were demolished, however most in the triangle area where protected and today stand as monuments to the past.

Architecture
The Weavers triangle is notable for the juxtaposition of so many 19th-century buildings rather than specific building. However, Ashmore, in his work on industrial archaeology, does point out certain specific buildings of interest.

Canal warehouses
At Manchester Road Wharf on the southern side of the canal, there is a group of three warehouses each of a different age and style. On wharf I (SD8387 3228) there is an 1801 two-storey, stone warehouse of seven by three bays. It was built parallel to the canal allowing direct unloading from the barges using catshead cranes. On wharf II (SD 8385 3235) there is a single-storey, open-fronted stone warehouse. This was built in the 1890s. The roof is supported by four rows of full-height cast-iron columns. This type of warehouse remained a feature of dock architecture well into the 20th century. On wharf III at SD8383 3232 is a four-storey 1841 stone-built warehouse, that is parallel to the canal. The floors and the queen post truss roof are supported by cast-iron columns. On the road side there is a projecting three-storey loading bay.

Weaving sheds
A traditional weaving mill would have a two- or three-storey preparation area for pirning the yarn, beaming and sizing attached to an engine house with a 500 hp mill engine, boiler house and chimney. The line shafts from the engine would pass into a large single-storey weaving shed with its characteristic sawtooth roof with north lights. Weaving was the principal activity here, the larger spinning mills of the Oldham Limited of the late 19th century ware built in towns further south. The Burnley loom was a narrow loom that produced grey cloth suitable for printing. Here we find many such stone-built mills such as the Waterloo Shed north of Trafalgar Street and the Wiseman Street Shed, the Sandygate Shed (c1860), and the brick-built Woodfield Mill (1886).

Spinning mills
Victoria Mill SD833326  early four-storey spinning mill from the 1850 built on Trafalgar Street for throstle spinning, There was however a small attached weaving shed.

Combined mills
Trafalgar mill to the west of Waterloo shed is an example of a combined mill- one that did the spinning and then passed the yarn to its own weaving sheds. This was a four-storey stone built in 1840 as mule spinning mill and later extended with attached weaving sheds. Sprinkler systems became essential in the 1880s and a water tank was added. Clock Tower mill, on the north side of the canal east of Sandygate was another. It was built c. 1840 by George Slater; there were four- and five-storey spinning mills by the canal and a six-storey 5-by-9-bay with a clock tower, the weaving shed was to the east. John Watts (Burnley) Ltd ran the mill from 1890 to the 1980s.

Foundries
Burnley was the home to the Burnley Iron Works SD 836326   a large engineering firm, which made mill engines including the Harle Syke engine displayed in the London Science Museum. Butterworth & Dickinson, Harling and Todd and Pemberton had foundries and built looms here. Globe Iron Works was firstly used by but was taken over in 1870 by Butterfield and Dickinson. The Waterloo Iron works was owned by Onias Pickles, who acquired the business of Thomas Sagar manufacturing plain Burnley looms. In 1887 it was bought by the Pemberton Brothers who continued in manufacturing until 1963.

Visitor centre

In 1977, the Burnley Industrial Museum Action Committee was formed to work for the preservation of the town's heritage. The Weavers' Triangle Toll House museum was established on 26 July 1980, and opened by Brian Redhead. and is staffed by volunteers the Weavers' Triangle Trust. It was initially housed in 2 rooms of the former canal offices on Manchester Road, but expanded into the adjacent wharfmaster's house in 1987 and was renamed to the Weavers' Triangle Visitor Centre. It has also received accreditation from Museums, Libraries and Archives Council. In 1993 they took over the engine house and chimney at Oak Mount Mill. In 1996, a project began to restore the steam engine at Oak Mount Mill with funding from the National Lottery, Burnley council and the Museums and Galleries Commission. The restoration project was completed in 2001, with an electric motor powering the engine as replacing the boiler was deemed too expensive. Both the engine and the building are now listed as scheduled monuments.

Geography

The Weavers Triangle's 19th-century industrial landscape forms the south western edge of the town centre in Burnley, it adjoins the civic, cultural and commercial centres of the town. It is bounded on the south-west by established housing. The River Calder passes through the town, and is joined by the River Brun. The Leeds and Liverpool Canal is the spine around which the Weavers Triangle developed when it was built in 1796 giving Burnley access to Liverpool and a supply of cotton from the Mississippi Basin and Egypt, and coal to power steam engines.

The heritage area of the Weavers' Triangle is defined by an area bounded by Manchester Road, Trafalgar Street, Westgate and Queen's Lancashire Way. In planning terms the Weavers' Triangle development area expands further south-west, and along the canal to Finsley Gate bridge.

Burnley Way passes through the area and along the towpath of the canal starting and finishing at the Visitor Centre. The Caldervale railway passes to the south, and Manchester Road station is approximately 200 metres from the visitor centre, . The East Lancashire Line passes to the north, and Barracks station is north of the site.

Regeneration

1980s
In April 1987, Clock Tower Mill was damaged by a fire that rendered the building unusable.

1990s

Between 1990 and 1996 extensive refurbishment took place at Trafalgar Mill funded by the ERDF, English Heritage and Burnley Council. The work included re-roofing, repointing, sand blasting the walls and replacing windows. Parts of the building have been let to local businesses.

In the mid-1990s Burnley wharf (of which the visitor centre is a part) was restored in a joint project involving British Waterways. The £1 million project included a bar and restaurant in one of the former warehouses.

In March 1996, Mile Wharf Ltd and British Waterways started work to turn Finsley Wharf into a marina and leisure complex. In 1996 a bid was submitted to the Millennium Fund for a £2.5 million scheme to provide a visual arts centre and public square and to widen the canal to provide extra moorings, it included reconstruction of the clock at Clock Tower Mill.

In 1998 Liverpool-based Millview Developments purchased Sandygate Mill as part of a plan to turn Slater Terrace weavers' cottages into a luxury canalside hotel. The scheme collapsed in 1999, when Millview could not find an interested buyer. In June 1999 a fire gutted the upper floors of Sandygate Mill.

In 1999, after three years in the planning stages, work started to restore the former Proctors' Iron Works in Hammerton Street, between the town centre and the triangle area. It was hoped that a nightclub and hotel complex and street improvements would encourage future investment on the canal side. The project received funding from the ERDF and English Heritage, and the nightclub component proved successful.

2000s
In May 2001, a deal was announced between British Waterways and Nelson-based NEL Construction to redevelop Finsley Wharf. The £1.2 million project would include office space and a canal side pub and restaurant. In early 2002 Millview offered its property in the area for sale, alongside Victoria Mill which was already on the market. A structural survey showed Clock Tower Mill to be in a dangerous condition. Demolition was the only viable option and was completed in January 2004. In February Globe Works was demolished.

In April 2004, Birmingham-based St. Modwen Properties purchased Healey Royd and Finsley Gate Mills. In May, Rossendale-based Hurstwood Developments purchased the Millview properties and began work on a new plan for the area and acquired Victoria Mill.
In April 2005, Amberfell Estates received outline planning permission to demolish part of Thorneybank Mill in Nelson Square, with a view to building 24 homes. In March 2006 it was announced that a £260 million master plan for redevelopment of the whole area, had been drawn up to attract developers to the project.

At the end of the month, St. Modwen released a plan for a £10m redevelopment of their site. Under this plan Healey Royd Mill and the surrounding land would be used for housing and Finsley Gate would be converted into a business space complex. On a related visit to the town, English Heritage Chief Executive Dr Simon Thurley announced the appointment of two new specialist advisors to the project. Towards the end of the year Hurstwood submitted £50 million plans for properties on the site, including an 800 capacity music venue, restaurants, offices and homes. In April 2007, a fire (believed to be arson) destroyed a section of the roof of George Street Mill. In September, plans were released by the Elevate to redevelop the Victoria Mill complex. Based on the "Fashion Tower" concept suggested by Tony Wilson and his partner, 'Weave' was envisaged as a mixture of textile museum and designer fashion centre. A month later Hurstwood placed all its properties on the market. At the start of 2008, Hurstwood were persuaded to return and submitted revised plans. They stressed the urgent need to begin construction. Approximately £5 million of National Lottery and NWDA funding was secured for complementary heritage projects in the triangle. In February, on a visit to Burnley, Prince Charles travelled along the canal to inspect the state of the mills. In April Accrington-based Valegate submitted plans to redevelop the George Street Mill site including the demolition and rebuilding of much of the mill, with additional buildings to create a 167 unit apartment and shopping complex.

By now the world financial crisis was felt. Over the summer, three of Hurstwood's property arms collapsed into administration. In October it was announced that due to the financial climate the project was to be suspended for at least 2 years.

In November, a large part of Woodfield Mill (next to Victoria Mill) was demolished after a fire that destroyed the three-storey warehouse. In January 2009, former Chairman of English Heritage, Sir Neil Cossons was appointed to chair the steering group responsible for reinvigorating the site. At the start of April a £4.9m NWDA grant enabled Burnley Council to purchase Hurstwood's sites and the neighbouring premises of Dexter paints. Later that month, £65,000 was requested to save the former Neptune Pub. The 200-year-old, three-storey building is believed to be the oldest remaining structure in the area. Despite failing to secure planning permission the previous year, Valegate opted to proceed with the demolition of George Street Mill and submitted updated plans in May, which were again rejected. In June, St. Modwen decided to demolish Finsley Gate and Healey Royd mills. In September, repair work, funded by Burnley Council and NWDA, began on Victoria Mill and the Neptune Building.

2010s
In July 2014, a new canal footbridge was lowered into place at the heart of the Weavers' Triangle 'On the Banks' development. The 50 ton Sandygate canal footbridge spans the Leeds and Liverpool Canal, off Trafalgar Street. The canal footbridge opened to the public in December 2014.

References

External links

 The Weavers' Triangle Trust
 Spinning the Web – The Story of the Cotton Industry
 Burnley Borough Council – Weavers' Triangle

Buildings and structures in Burnley
Museums in Lancashire
Cotton mills
Cotton industry in England
Textile museums in the United Kingdom
Steam museums in England
Canal museums in England
Industrial archaeological sites in England